Lake Te Paritu, also known as Black Lake, is one of two small crater lakes on Mayor Island / Tuhua in the Bay of Plenty, New Zealand. It is connected to the larger Lake Aroarotamahine or Green Lake by a wetland, but there is no surface outlet to the sea as both lakes are in a depression.

Black colour
The lake has a black colour due to fine sediment. According to Māori legend, the black is the blood of Tuhua (obsidian) which fought a battle with Pounamu (greenstone) who, defeated, fled to the South Island.

References

Lakes of the Bay of Plenty Region
Volcanic crater lakes